Carmine Nigro (January 2, 1910 –  August 16, 2001) was former World Champion Bobby Fischer's first chess teacher, from 1951 to 1956.

Biography
"Mr. Nigro was possibly not the best player in the world, but he was a very good teacher." – Bobby Fischer 

Nigro was an American chess expert of near master strength and an instructor.  Nigro was President of the Brooklyn Chess Club. This is where he met Bobby Fischer and in 1951 became his first chess teacher. Nigro (rated 2028) hosted Fischer's first chess tournament at his home in 1952.

Nigro introduced Fischer to future grandmaster William Lombardy, and, starting in September 1954, Lombardy began coaching Fischer in private.

In 1956, Nigro moved to Florida and became a professional golf instructor. He did not give up teaching chess, though, and in 1996 he taught chess at the Meyer Jewish Academy. In 1999, Nigro moved to Peachtree City, Georgia, to be close to his son Bill Nigro.  He died in 2001, at the age of 91.

In film

In the 2014 American biographical film Pawn Sacrifice, Carmine Nigro was played by Conrad Pla.

Notes

References
 
 
 
McClain, Dylan Loeb "Carmine Nigro, 91, Bobby Fischer's First Chess Teacher", New York Times, 2 September 2001
 
Wall, Bill  mentions Nigro (no date)

External links
More Than Just A Golfer

1910 births
2001 deaths
American chess players
Chess coaches
People from Peachtree City, Georgia
American golf instructors
American people of Italian descent
20th-century American educators
20th-century chess players